Spencer House, also known as the Gene McLendon House, is a historic home located at Bishopville, Lee County, South Carolina.  It was built about 1845, and is a two-story, vernacular Greek Revival style house. It features a two-story, pedimented portico supported by four square frame pillars with Doric order capitals. The house has a one-story, gable roofed rear ell with a large exterior brick chimney.  It is very similar in floor plan and appearance to the William Rogers House.

It was added to the National Register of Historic Places in 1986.

References 

Houses on the National Register of Historic Places in South Carolina
Greek Revival houses in South Carolina
Houses completed in 1845
Houses in Lee County, South Carolina
National Register of Historic Places in Lee County, South Carolina